Capri Silvestri Cafaro (born November 21, 1977) is a former Democratic member of the Ohio Senate, representing the 32nd District from 2007 to 2016. From the Mahoning Valley, Cafaro served three terms as an Ohio State Senator (2007-2016), including a stint as Minority Leader from 2009 to 2012.  Her district included all of Trumbull County, Ashtabula County and portions of Geauga County (including the City of Chardon; but excluding Chardon Township).

She is currently a TV personality, appearing as a contributor on Fox News Channel, primarily as a semi-regular co-host of the afternoon talk show Outnumbered.  Cafaro is of Italian descent.

Career
Cafaro was born and raised in Youngstown, Ohio, and graduated from Stanford University with a BA in American Studies and from Georgetown University with a MALS in International Studies. She served on the Trumbull County Senior Services Advisory Council and was a State Policy Liaison for Ohio with the National Patient Advocate Foundation. She was also a State Advocate Representative for the National Committee to Preserve Social Security and Medicare and served as a councilor for the Medicare Rights Center. Cafaro has also acted as an Economic Policy Associate for Global Action on Aging, an NGO with consultative status at the United Nations.

As a political novice, Cafaro won a surprise victory in the 2004 Democratic primary for Ohio's 14th congressional district, topping a five-candidate field, which included 2002 nominee Dale V. Blanchard, columnist Herb Hammer, U.S. Marine Charles L. Wolfe, and Ohio state Rep. Ed Jerse (who received the endorsement of the Akron Beacon Journal newspaper). Cafaro polled 54% of the vote, while Jerse, the second-place finisher, managed 19%. In the general election, however, she lost to Republican Steve LaTourette.

Cafaro again ran for the Democratic nomination in the open 13th Congressional District in 2006, placing second in a nine-candidate primary, behind future Congresswoman Betty Sutton. That seat was vacated by U.S. Representative Sherrod Brown, Democrat who replaced Republican Senator Mike DeWine in the U.S. Senate after defeating him on November 7, 2006.

As of 2017, Cafaro was the Executive in Residence at American University's School of Public Affairs and gave commentary on political events as a contributor on Fox News.

Ohio Senate
In 2007, Cafaro was appointed to the 32nd District of the Ohio Senate to replace Marc Dann after Dann won the Ohio Attorney General's race on November 7, 2006.

One year after becoming a member of the Ohio General Assembly, Cafaro secured a leadership position as the assistant minority whip for the Senate Democrats.

In 2008, Cafaro was elected to her first full term after running unopposed in the general election.  Soon after, she was elected Minority Leader by her colleagues for the 128th General Assembly. Cafaro again served as Minority Leader in the 129th General Assembly.   Cafaro would serve as Leader for three years until she stepped down and was replaced in 2012 as Ohio Senate Minority Leader by Senator Eric Kearney. She won a second full term to her Senate seat in the 2012 general election, defeating Republican Nancy McArthur 67% to 33%.

Cafaro played a prominent role in the Medicaid expansion efforts in Ohio, and has sought to codify the expansion permanently in Ohio law. She has offered legislation numerous times to do so.

Cafaro did not seek reelection to the Ohio state senate in 2016 due to term limits.

Election history

See also
Election Results, U.S. Representative from Ohio, 14th District

References

External links
USA Today - Campaign 2004: Capri Silvestri Cafaro (D) profile
Capri Cafaro at the Ohio Ladies' Gallery, 2010

Democratic Party Ohio state senators
1977 births
Living people
Georgetown College (Georgetown University) alumni
Stanford University alumni
Politicians from Youngstown, Ohio
Women state legislators in Ohio
21st-century American politicians
21st-century American women politicians
Candidates in the 2004 United States elections
Candidates in the 2006 United States elections
People from Hubbard, Ohio